The Iranian grading system is similar to that of France's and other French-patterned grading systems such as Belgium, Lebanon, Venezuela, and Peru in secondary schools and universities. Since a grading guideline is not provided by the Iranian Ministry of Education, conversion to the international scales is carried out using conversion guideline provided for French-patterned grading systems. In specific cases, grades are converted according to the destination institutes' grading policy. The passing grade is 10 and usually a grade of more than 14 out of 20 is considered excellent. The following table is most commonly used by world institutes and universities to convert from the Iranian grading system:

The above table does not corroborate with the scale most U.S. and Canadian institutions use where a grade between 18-20 scale to an "A," 15-7 scale to a "B," 12-14 scale to a "C," a grade between 10-11 is treated as a "D," and a score below 10 is considered a failing grade. 

The above is also noted in the Scholaro Database.

References

Iran
Grading
Grading